Martin Brennan may refer to:

 Martin Brennan (Irish politician) (1903–1967), Irish medical practitioner and Fianna Fáil politician, TD from 1938 to 1948
 Martin Brennan (engineer), computer engineer who worked for Sinclair Research and Atari
 Martin A. Brennan (1879–1941), U.S. Representative from Illinois
 Martin Brennan (hurler) (born 1946), Irish retired sportsperson
 Martin Stanislaus Brennan  (1845–1927), American Roman Catholic priest and scientist
 Martin Brennan (footballer) (born 1982), English footballer